Micheline Patton (1912 – 30 June 2001) was an Irish actress who worked on radio, stage and television from the mid-1930s to the mid-1960s.

Biography
Micheline Elizabeth Patton was born in Belfast in 1912, and died on 30 June 2001 in Godalming, Surrey.  Her father was Billy Patton, a surgeon. She went to school in Malvern Girls' College, and studied Modern History at St Hugh's College, Oxford, graduating in 1935. One of her cousins was the Irish playwright, BBC producer and war correspondent Denis Johnston.

Radio
Between 1935 and 1947, Patton read several short stories for BBC Radio, including works by Katherine Mansfield, Anton Chekhov, and Helen Colvill. She acted in radio plays, including playing the role of Winifred in the 1947 BBC Radio adaptation of In Chancery from The Forsyte Saga.

Television

Patton acted in early BBC television broadcasts. In December 1937, she appeared in a backless dress in the final episode of the early fashion documentary Clothes-Line. Patton was viewed from behind, giving an illusion of nudity, which led to outraged viewers writing in to complain. The episode was titled Grandmamma Looks Back, inspiring the copresenter Pearl Binder's quip, "Grandmamma looks back but Micheline has no back to be seen."

She went on to appear in a November 1938 adaptation of Robert J. Flaherty's book The Captain's Chair (produced as The Last Voyage of Captain Grant).
and in July 1939, a drama based on the Parnell Commission.

In 1947 Patton had a small role in Weep for the Cyclops, a biographical 1947 television drama on Jonathan Swift, which was written and produced by her cousin Denis Johnston.

Patton's final recorded BBC appearance was in 1958, with a role in The Ordeal of Christabel Pankhurst.

Theatre

Patton's best received role was probably as Emily Brontë in The Brontës, by Alfred Sangster, produced by the Sheffield Repertory Company. She played this role from 1946–1949, receiving generally good notices. in 1946 a reviewer for the Brontë Society noted that Patton was so "exceptionally good that one suspected (perhaps too artlessly) a spiritual affinity. What strength that pale, frigid face reflected!" A reviewer for Punch commented on the "interesting" Patton's ability to "suggest dark churnings of the soul." Less enthusiastically, in 1947, a reviewer for Theatre World commented "Micheline Patton does all that could be done with her material," calling the part "poorly written."

1936 on the London stage
 Stubble Before Swords at Globe
 A Bride for the Unicorn at Westminster Theatre
1940 in Dublin
 Roly Poly (Boule de Suif) was withdrawn under Wartime Emergency Legislation (1745 Act).
1941 in Belfast
 The Passing of the Third Floor Back (Jerome K. Jerome) was concurrent with the first Luftwaffe air-raid
1944–1945 in various provincial Scottish theatres
 Dundee Repertory Theatre
 The Patsy
 The Housemaster
 A Soldier for Christmas
 Seven Bottles for the Maestro
 Perth Repertory Theatre
 Charley's Aunt
 Androcles and the Lion
 Caste
 Hamlet
 Sheppey
1946 English provincial theatre
 Bristol Old Vic
 Weep for the Cyclops
1946–1949 Sheffield Repertory Theatre and touring – most saliently, St James Theatre London
The Brontes
1949 London Players
 Aftermath
1950 St James Theatre
 Venus Observed
1951 Citizens Theatre Glasgow
 As You Like It
1954 Hythe Summer Theatre
 The Powder Magazine
1957 Piccadilly Theatre
 The Rape of the Belt
1960 Richmond Theatre
 Gracious Living

Film
Patton appeared as Mrs. Broome in The Yellow Teddy Bears in 1963.

Notes

References

External links

Ulster Actors – Micheline Patton

1912 births
2001 deaths
Actresses from Belfast
Alumni of St Hugh's College, Oxford
British film actresses
British radio actresses
British stage actresses
British television actresses
Film actresses from Northern Ireland
Irish film actresses
Irish radio actresses
Irish stage actresses
Irish television actresses
Radio actresses from Northern Ireland
Stage actresses from Northern Ireland
Television actresses from Northern Ireland